The following highways are numbered 304:

Brazil
 BR-304

Canada
 Manitoba Provincial Road 304
 Nova Scotia Route 304
 Prince Edward Island Route 304
 Saskatchewan Highway 304

China
 China National Highway 304

Costa Rica
 National Route 304

Hungary
 Main road 304 (Hungary)

Japan
 Japan National Route 304

Thailand
  Highway 304 (Thailand)

United States
  Arkansas Highway 304
  Arkansas Highway 304N
  Florida State Road 304 (former)
  Georgia State Route 304 (former)
  Louisiana Highway 304
  Maryland Route 304
  Mississippi Highway 304
  Montana Secondary Highway 304
  Nevada State Route 304
  New Mexico State Road 304
  New York State Route 304
  North Carolina Highway 304
  Ohio State Route 304
  Pennsylvania Route 304
  Pennsylvania Route 304 Truck
  South Carolina Highway 304
  Tennessee State Route 304
 Texas:
  Texas State Highway 304
  Texas State Highway Loop 304
  Farm to Market Road 304
  Utah State Route 304
  Virginia State Route 304
  Washington State Route 304

Other areas:
  Puerto Rico Highway 304
  U.S. Virgin Islands Highway 304